Timo Wenzel (born 30 November 1977) is a German football manager and former player.

Career
Wenzel was born in Neu-Ulm. He appeared in the Bundesliga with VfB Stuttgart, 1. FC Kaiserslautern (January 2004 – 2006) and in the 2. Bundesliga with FC Augsburg. He signed a two-year contract with AC Omonia of the Cypriot First Division on 29 April 2008.

Position
He is equally adept playing on either the left flank or the centre.

Honours
VfB Stuttgart
UEFA Intertoto Cup: 2002

Omonia
Cypriot Championship: 2010
Cypriot Cup: 2011
Cypriot Super Cup: 2010

References

1977 births
Living people
German footballers
Germany B international footballers
Association football central defenders
Bundesliga players
2. Bundesliga players
3. Liga players
Cypriot First Division players
Super League Greece players
VfB Stuttgart players
VfB Stuttgart II players
1. FC Kaiserslautern players
FC Augsburg players
AC Omonia players
A.O. Kerkyra players
SV Elversberg players
German expatriate footballers
German expatriate sportspeople in Cyprus
Expatriate footballers in Cyprus
German expatriate sportspeople in Greece
Expatriate footballers in Greece
People from Neu-Ulm
Sportspeople from Swabia (Bavaria)
Footballers from Bavaria